Pollock  is a 2000 American independent biographical drama film centered on the life of American painter Jackson Pollock, his struggles with alcoholism, as well as his troubled marriage to his wife Lee Krasner. The film stars Ed Harris, Marcia Gay Harden, Jennifer Connelly, Robert Knott, Bud Cort, Molly Regan, and Sada Thompson, and was directed by Harris.

Marcia Gay Harden won the Academy Award for Best Supporting Actress for portraying Lee. Ed Harris received an Academy Award nomination for Best Actor for his portrayal of Pollock. The film was a long-term personal project for Harris based on his reading of the 1989 biography Jackson Pollock: An American Saga, written by Steven Naifeh and Gregory White Smith.

Plot
In the 1940s, abstract expressionist painter Jackson Pollock exhibits paintings in occasional group art shows. 

Pollock lives with his brother Sande and sister-in-law Arloie at a tiny apartment in New York City. With Arloie expecting a new baby, Pollock decides to move out on her behalf. Soon afterward, Pollock meets and takes an interest in artist Lee Krasner. He learns later that his brother has taken a job in Connecticut building military gliders to avoid the draft. 

Pollock, a struggling alcoholic, goes on a drinking binge and is found in a disheveled state by Sande and Lee to which Sande tells Lee that Pollock has been diagnosed as "clinically neurotic." Taking pity on Pollock, Lee takes him home and becomes his manager.

One day, Pollock's old friend Reuben Kadish visits him, bringing along Howard Putzel, who works for wealthy art collector Peggy Guggenheim. After Guggenheim views his work, he is given a contract to exhibit his paintings, plus a commission to paint a 8 ft by 20 ft mural in her New York townhouse entry way. Pollock's first exhibit fails to attract any buyers. After a New Year's Eve party, a drunken Pollock almost sleeps with Peggy. Afterwards, he falls into another stupor upon hearing that Putzel has died.

Pollock and Lee are wed after Lee says they either marry or "split up" before moving to Long Island. During a get-together at Peggy's, Pollock dismisses art critic Clement Greenberg's comments and refuses to change his painting style to be more marketable. Pollock's paintings are not selling but Clement assures him it will change after a Life magazine article about him is published and his upcoming exhibit. 

Pollock and Lee's relationship is strained after he openly flirts with another woman. Meanwhile, to earn more income, Pollock tries various occupations but fails due to his alcoholism. He lies to Sande about his financial status, though this improves after the Life story about him is published. Later, cinematographer Hans Namuth films Pollock as he paints, though Namuth's presence interrupts the spontaneous nature of his work. Pollock, who tried abstaining from alcohol, inadvertently ruins Thanksgiving dinner upon relapsing.

In medias res to the events of the film, Pollock autographs a copy of the Life magazine to a fan at an art exhibit in 1950. Five years after the exhibit, Clement tells Pollock that the Partisan Review is favoring artist Clyfford Still, saying that his original technique could be the next direction of modern art. 

A drunk Pollock reacts badly, becoming angrier when Lee berates him for his drinking and womanizing. By this moment, Pollack's marriage to Lee has become even more strained due to her refusal to conceive children with him, all of which has led Pollock to start an extramarital affair with teenage abstract artist Ruth Kligman. 

In 1956, following a conversation with Lee over the phone while she’s in Venice, Pollock tells Ruth "I owe the woman something." On a subsequent visit, Ruth brings along her friend Edith before the three go for a drive. However, an intoxicated Pollock crashes the car; killing himself, Edith, and throwing Ruth into a ditch, seriously injuring her. Closing titles state that Lee never remarried following Pollock's death.

Cast

 Ed Harris as Jackson Pollock
 Marcia Gay Harden as Lee Krasner
 Tom Bower as Dan Miller
 Jennifer Connelly as Ruth Kligman
 Bud Cort as Howard Putzel
 John Heard as Tony Smith
 Val Kilmer as Willem de Kooning
 Amy Madigan as Peggy Guggenheim
 Sally Murphy as Edith Metzger
 Stephanie Seymour as Helen Frankenthaler
 Matthew Sussman as Reuben Kadish
 Jeffrey Tambor as Clement Greenberg
 Norbert Weisser as Hans Namuth
 Everett Quinton as James Johnson Sweeney
 Annabelle Gurwitch as May Rosenberg
 John Rothman as Harold Rosenberg
 Kenny Scharf as William Baziotes
 Sada Thompson as Stella Pollock
 Robert O'Neill as Herbert Matter

Production
The film was adapted by Barbara Turner and Susan Emshwiller from the book Jackson Pollock: An American Saga by Steven Naifeh and Gregory White Smith.  It was directed by Harris.

This film was a longtime passion project for Ed Harris. After his father gave him a copy of Pollock's biography, he started thinking about adapting it, which took almost 10 years to bring to fruition.

Filming took a mere 50 days with a six-week layoff after forty days so Harris could take time to gain thirty pounds and grow a beard.

Harris himself did all the painting seen in the film.

Reception

Critical response
Pollock received positive reviews from critics and has a "certified fresh" score of 81% on Rotten Tomatoes based on 108 reviews with an average rating of 7/10. The critical consensus states, "Though Pollock does not really allow audiences a glimpse of the painter as a person, it does powerfully depict the creative process. Harris throws himself into the role and turns in a compelling performance." The film also has a score of 77 out of 100 on Metacritic based on 31 critics indicating "generally favorable reviews".

Box office
Pollock opened on December 15, 2000 in North America in a limited release in 2 theaters and grossed $44,244 with an average of $22,122 per theater and ranking #37 at the box office. The film's widest release was 280 theaters and it ended up earning $8,598,593 domestically and $1,960,377 internationally for a total of $10,558,970.

Accolades

Soundtrack
The soundtrack to Pollock was released on February 13, 2001.

References

External links
 
 
 
 Breathing fire into an artist

2000 films
2000s English-language films
2000s biographical films
2000 directorial debut films
American biographical films
Biographical films about painters
Cultural depictions of 20th-century painters
Sony Pictures Classics films
Films about alcoholism
Films based on biographies
Films directed by Ed Harris
2000 independent films
Films featuring a Best Supporting Actress Academy Award-winning performance
Films scored by Jeff Beal
Films set in New York City
Films set in the 1940s
Films set in 1941
Films set in 1942
Films set in 1943
Films set in 1945
Films set in 1947
Films set in 1949
Films set in the 1950s
Films set in 1950
Films set in 1956
Films set in Long Island
Films shot in New York City
Jackson Pollock
Films about mental health
Films produced by Jon Kilik
2000s American films